The Ramapo Valley County Reservation, also known as the Ramapo Reservation, is a  county park located in Mahwah, New Jersey in Bergen County, bordering Ringwood State Park to the north and the Ramapo Mountain State Forest to the south. The park lies on the border of the Piedmont and Highlands geologic provinces.

The park offers hiking along a mountain brook with a waterfall, fishing in the Ramapo River, Scarlet Oak Pond, MacMillan Reservoir, and tent camping. Trails connect to the network of trails in the adjoining state forest and state park.  The park also affords carry-in access to the Ramapo River for canoe, kayak and raft owners.

The Reservation is popular among students from nearby Ramapo College, less than a mile away on Route 202, and acts as the school's Environmental Science laboratory.

The park is also a noted geocaching hotspot in conjunction with the aforementioned adjoining parks.

The former Bergen County Police substation near the parking lot serves as the headquarters for New Jersey Search and Rescue.

October 2015 closure
The Ramapo Mountain Reservation was closed indefinitely to visitors on October 15, 2015, while authorities investigated increased bear activity. The ban has since been lifted.

References

External links
 New York-New Jersey Trail Conference

Mahwah, New Jersey
Parks in Bergen County, New Jersey
Ramapos
County parks in New Jersey